The Fatal Card is a 1915 American drama silent film directed by James Kirkwood, Sr., adapted from the 1884 London play of the same name by Charles Haddon Chambers and B. C. Stephenson. The film stars John Mason, Hazel Dawn, Russell Bassett, Helen Weir, David Powell and William J. Ferguson. The film was released on September 30, 1915, by Paramount Pictures.

Plot

Cast 
John B. Mason as George Forrester
Hazel Dawn as Margaret Marrable
Russell Bassett as A.K. Austen
Helen Weir as Cecile 
David Powell as Gerald Austen
William J. Ferguson as Jim Dixon

References

External links 
 

1915 films
1910s English-language films
Silent American drama films
1915 drama films
Paramount Pictures films
Films directed by James Kirkwood Sr.
American black-and-white films
American silent feature films
1910s American films